The 2018 Kaspersky Riga Masters was a professional ranking snooker tournament that took place between 27 and 29 July 2018 at the Arena Riga in Riga, Latvia. It was the first ranking event of the 2018/2019 season.

Ryan Day was the defending champion, however he lost 3–4 to Ali Carter in the last 64.

Liang Wenbo made the highest break of the tournament with 140 in the second round against Neil Robertson. Liang potted all blacks with reds during the break but this was not a maximum break as he potted 13th and 14th reds in the same shot.

Neil Robertson won the event for the second time in three years, winning his 14th ranking title, defeating Jack Lisowski 5–2 in the final. This was Lisowski's first ranking event final.

Prize fund
The breakdown of prize money for this year is shown below:

 Winner: £50,000
 Runner-up: £25,000
 Semi-final: £15,000
 Quarter-final: £6,000
 Last 16: £4,000
 Last 32: £3,000
 Last 64: £1,500

 Highest break: £2,000
 Total: £259,000

The "rolling 147 prize" for a maximum break stood at £10,000

Main draw

Final

Qualifying
These matches were held between 2 and 5 July 2018 at the Preston Guild Hall in Preston, England. All matches were the best of 7 frames.

Notes

Century breaks

Televised stage centuries
Total: 31

 140, 110  Liang Wenbo
 133  Peter Lines
 128, 122, 115, 115  Zhao Xintong
 125, 104, 101  Joe Perry
 122  Marco Fu
 121  Jamie Jones
 120  Shaun Murphy
 120  Zhang Yong
 117, 114, 113, 110, 110, 101  Neil Robertson
 115  Fergal O'Brien
 115  Chris Wakelin
 114  Alfie Burden
 110, 109  Stuart Carrington
 110  Ben Woollaston
 106  Mark King
 105  Kyren Wilson
 103  Ricky Walden
 102  Stephen Maguire
 101  Jack Lisowski

Qualifying stage centuries
Total: 18

 140  Michael White
 137  Scott Donaldson
 137  Li Yuan
 137  Noppon Saengkham
 133  Kurt Maflin
 123, 107  Neil Robertson
 118, 111  David Lilley
 112  Mark Joyce
 109  Tom Ford
 107  Rod Lawler
 106  Ali Carter
 106  Stephen Maguire
 105  Liang Wenbo
 104  Mark Davis
 102  Yan Bingtao
 100  Zhang Jiankang

References

2018
Riga Masters (snooker)
Riga Masters (snooker)
July 2018 sports events in Europe